Samantha Spinner and the Super-Secret Plans is a children's mystery novel centered on an eponymous character, Samantha, an 11-year-old from Seattle. Her uncle Paul disappeared mysteriously and left her siblings expensive gifts. Her brother, Nipper, received the New York Yankees. Her sister, Buffy, received $2,400,000,000. Samantha received only a rusty red umbrella. Eventually, she discovered that the umbrella lining contains maps and diagrams to secret means of traveling around the globe.

It is the first title in the four-part Samantha Spinner book series, to be released by Random House 2018–2021.

The underside of the umbrella contains a map of secret passages which they expect will help find Samantha's uncle, but outlaw ninjas from the sewers are in pursuit of them.

The story uses Samantha's brother Nipper as a device to add educational content to the story.

The book was written by Russell Ginns, who has written over 100 books and also designed video game software.

Countries and Landmarks  
Throughout the series, the characters explore locations, famous and obscure, around the globe. In the first two published books, they visit:

The Louvre - France; The Eiffel Tower - France;  The Florence Duomo - Italy; The Fountain of Neptune - Italy; The Temple of Horus - Egypt; Times Square - USA; The Space Needle - USA; The Great Mosque - Mali; Borobudur Temple - Indonesia; Machu Picchu - Peru

Awards  
The 2018 audiobook edition, narrated by Kathleen McInerney and Grover Gardner, was listed an Earphones award winner by AudioFile Magazine.

See also 

 Holes, a young-adult mystery comedy novel by Louis Sachar
 The 39 Clues, a series of collaboratively authored adventure novels

References

External links 
 Official website

Fiction set in 2018
American adventure novels
American children's novels
American young adult novels
Novels set in Egypt
Novels set in Florence
Novels set in Paris
Novels set in Seattle
Novels by Russell Ginns